Rekha Yadav is an Indian politician and a member of the Bharatiya Janshakti Party. She was the member of the Madhya Pradesh Legislative Assembly, representing Malhara constituency in Chhatarpur district. She was elected from this constituency in 2008.

See also
 Madhya Pradesh Legislative Assembly Election 2008

References 

Living people
People from Chhatarpur district
Madhya Pradesh MLAs 2008–2013
Bharatiya Janata Party politicians from Madhya Pradesh
21st-century Indian women politicians
21st-century Indian politicians
Bharatiya Janshakti Party politicians
Year of birth missing (living people)
Women members of the Madhya Pradesh Legislative Assembly